The 1983 Warner W. Hodgdon Carolina 500 was a NASCAR Winston Cup Series race that was scheduled to be held on Sunday, March 6, 1983, at North Carolina Motor Speedway in Rockingham, North Carolina. The race started on its scheduled date but the overcast skies opened up with steady rain soon after 100 laps were completed, forcing the race to be stopped for the day. The race concluded one week later on March 13, a pleasant sunny day.

Several hard crashes during the race sidelined drivers; Joe Ruttman crashed his #98 Buick going into turn three, sending the windshield flying out of his car and over the outer wall. Geoff Bodine in Pontiac #50 had a fast car and led many laps, but crashed out while attempting to lap Cale Yarborough's #28 Chevy. With 42 laps to go Yarborough and Neil Bonnett in the #75 Chevy, who had been swapping the lead between them, tangled and crashed entering turn one when Bonnett ducked below Yarborough. Both cars spun and Yarborough slid back into the outside wall. The 28 car was heavily damaged in the rear and shortened by nearly five feet but limped home for a 9th-place finish, 6 laps down. Bonnett dropped out with damage from the wreck with 9 laps to go and finished 12th. Richard Petty barely held off a hard-charging Bill Elliott in a close side by side fight to the checkered flag.

Race report
At the start of the race were 35 American-born drivers; Ernie Cline was the last-place finisher due to a crash on lap 2. Crashes and engine problems would take out more than a dozen drivers; with Neil Bonnett being the highest-finishing driver not to complete the race. Ruttman slammed the outside wall after spinning in oil. He spun backward and his left rear slammed the wall and Ruttman bounced off nearly getting airborne, almost flipping. His day would ultimately end on lap 176.

Richard Petty would end up beating Bill Elliott by half a car length in one of the closest finishes at the speedway. Petty would acquire his only win in a race televised by ESPN. This event was Richard Petty's 196th win in the NASCAR Winston Cup Series in addition to his 900th Winston Cup Series start.

The leaders for the first 100 laps of the race would be Ricky Rudd, Dale Earnhardt, Cale Yarborough, Neil Bonnett, and Dick Brooks while the leaders during the last 100 laps would be Neil Bonnett, Darrell Waltrip, Richard Petty, and Bill Elliott. With 15 laps to go, Neil Bonnett and Cale Yarborough crashed in Turn 1 while racing for the lead.

Out of Ricky Rudd's three poles to start 1983 this was the only one that netted him a good finish, he did not finish at Daytona or Richmond but brought the #3 Chevrolet home with a top-10 finish here. A crowd of 37,000 NASCAR fans attended. 94 of 492 laps were run under caution.

Joe Ruttman would lose his championship lead to Bill Elliott after this event.

Individual winnings for this event ranged from the winner's share of $24,150 ($ when adjusted for inflation) to the last-place finisher's purse of $910 ($ when adjusted for inflation). The total prize purse offered was $199,065 ($ when adjusted for inflation).

Timeline
Section reference: 
 Start: The race started with a green/yellow flag and Ricky Rudd having the pole position.
 Lap 39: First caution due to Dave Marcis' engine failure; ended on lap 48.
 Lap 73: Second caution due to Dale Earnhardt's accident; ended on lap 77.
 Lap 111: Third caution due to Buddy Baker spinning his tires; ended on lap 118.
 Lap 139: Fourth caution due to rain; ended on lap 149.
 Lap 179: Fifth caution due to a 3-car accident; ended on lap 190.
 Lap 271: Sixth caution due to debris; caution ended on lap 274.
 Lap 403: Seventh caution due to Geoffrey Bodine's accident; ended on lap 413.
 Lap 452: Eighth caution due to a 2-car accident; ended on lap 459.
 Lap 477: Ninth caution due to Tommy Gale's accident; ended on lap 479.
 Finish: Richard Petty was officially declared the winner of the race.

Top 10 finishers

Standings after the race

References

Warner W. Hodgdon Carolina 500
Warner W. Hodgdon Carolina 500
NASCAR races at Rockingham Speedway